Kim Dong-soo is a Korean name consisting of the family name Kim and the given name Dong-soo, and may also refer to:

 Kim Dong-soo (baseball) (born 1968), South Korean baseball player
 Kim Dong-soo (canoeist) (born 1969), South Korean canoeist
 Kim Dong-soo (esports player) (born 1981), South Korean StarCraft player
 Kim Dong-su (footballer) (born 1995), South Korean association football player
  (born 1947), South Korean actor
  (born 1955), South Korean officer
  (born 1957), South Korean politician
  (born 1970), South Korean actor